Jason Harrod is an American guitarist and singer who writes and performs bluegrass/folk music.  Harrod's first album, Dreams of the Colorblind, was released in 1992. Harrod's first album was coreleased with songwriter Brian Funck, with whom he played until 1998.  The pair released three CDs, with their first studio CD (produced by Mark Heard) making it to number 38 on the CMJ AAA top 40 chart.  The pair broke up in 1998, and only Harrod continued in the music industry.  Since then, Harrod has released three albums, and has won several bluegrass/folk competitions, including the Chris Austin Songwriting competition in 2000. Harrod continues to write music. He also continues to perform concerts around the country.

Discography

Solo 
 Living in Skin (2000)
 Bright As You (2005)
 Highliner (2013)
 Highliner Acoustic (2014)

Singles and EPs 
 Christmas Hymns (2010)
 Out in the Fields (2015)

Harrod and Funck 
 Dreams of the Color Blind (1992)
 Harrod And Funck (1997)
 Live (1998)

References

External links 
 Jason Harrod
 Harrod and Funck 
 Brian Funck

Year of birth missing (living people)
Living people
American folk singers
Bluegrass musicians from North Carolina
American country singer-songwriters
Musicians from Durham, North Carolina
Singer-songwriters from North Carolina
Country musicians from North Carolina